Mobile file management (MFM) is a type of information technology (IT) software that allows businesses to manage transfers and storage of corporate files and other related items on a mobile device, and allows the business to oversee user access.  Mobile file management software is typically installed on a corporate file server like Windows 2008, and on a mobile device such as  tablet computers and smartphones, e.g., Android, iPad, iPhone, etc.  Other features include the ability to remotely wipe a lost or stolen device, access, cache and store files on a mobile device and integrate with file permission solutions like those from Microsoft's Active Directory.

A main advantage of modern mobile file management solutions is that they do not need a VPN connection for the mobile devices to connect to the corporate file servers. The connection between the mobile device and the corporate file server is established via a cloud service. This way the corporate file server doesn't need to open incoming ports which would cause security issues. The files are transferred highly encrypted e.g. according to AES 256-bit industry standard. Only the company server and the mobile device keep the encryption key to be able to encrypt and decrypt the files. So nobody, not even the mobile file management solution provider, can access the files.

Third-party cloud-based companies provide solutions which can be used to manage mobile files but are not controlled by corporate IT organizations. Companies that utilize Mobile Device Management solutions can also secure content on mobile devices, but usually cannot provide direct access and connection to a corporate file server.

File management is how the computer operating system keeps data organized through the use of files and folders, how they are arranged, and how they are listed in a hierarchical order. Mobile file management allows file management to be used on tablet computers. By installing it both on the tablet and the corporate server, users of mobile devices can freely access corporate servers from remote locations.

References

External links
 An Overview of Mobile File Management
 Mobile Document Management

Information technology
Business software